José Casanova is the name of:

 José Casanova (footballer), Peruvian footballer
 José Casanova (sociologist), American sociologist